Simeon Ivanov (born 8 February 1990) is a Bulgarian footballer who currently plays for Balkan Botevgrad as a defender.

Career

Levski Sofia
Ivanov made his debut for Levski's first team on 16 May 2007 in a match against Lokomotiv Plovdiv.

He became a part of the newly formed second team, PFC Levski Sofia B and won the title of the first season of the 'B' league.

Rayo Vallecano
On 1 February 2010, Ivanov signed with Spanish side Rayo Vallecano.

Return to Bulgaria
In February 2012, Ivanov was close to signing with A PFG club Vidima Rakovski, but eventually put pen to paper on a contract with second division side Akademik Sofia.

References

External links
 Ivanov at Levski's site
 donbalon.com
 Profile at LevskiSofia.info

Bulgarian footballers
1990 births
Living people
PFC Levski Sofia players
Akademik Sofia players
FC Lyubimets players
FC Vitosha Bistritsa players
FC Botev Vratsa players
PFC Dobrudzha Dobrich players
Neftochimic Burgas players
SFC Etar Veliko Tarnovo players
FC Lokomotiv Gorna Oryahovitsa players
FC Hebar Pazardzhik players
FC Sportist Svoge players
First Professional Football League (Bulgaria) players
Rayo Vallecano B players
Association football defenders